The 1991–92 Syracuse Orangemen basketball team represented Syracuse University in the 1991–92 NCAA Division I men's basketball season.  The Head coach was Jim Boeheim, serving for his 16th year.  The team played home games at the Carrier Dome in Syracuse, New York.  The team finished with a 22–10 (10–8) record, was Big East tournament champions, and advanced to second round of the NCAA tournament.

Roster

Schedule and results

|-
!colspan=8| Big East tournament

|-
!colspan=8| NCAA tournament

Rankings

1992 NBA draft

References

External links
1991-1992 Syracuse Orangemen at Orangehoops.org
1991-92 Syracuse FINAL (22-10, 10-8) Syracuse Combined Team Statistics

Syracuse Orange
Syracuse Orange men's basketball seasons
Syracuse
Syracuse Orange
Syracuse Orange